Amadjuak Lake is a lake in the Qikiqtaaluk Region, Nunavut, Canada. Along with Nettilling Lake, it is located in south-central Baffin Island's Great Plain of the Koukdjuak. The closest community is Iqaluit.

Geography

This lower-lying area only emerged 4,500 years ago (recently in geological terms) from beneath the waters of Foxe Basin. Amadjuak Lake is the second largest lake on Baffin Island (after Nettilling Lake) and third-largest in Nunavut.

Ethnography
The lake was a gathering place for Inuit from Kimmirut, Soper River Valley, Pangnirtung, Cape Dorset, and Frobisher Bay.

Fauna
Amadjuak Lake is also notable as a summer feeding grounds, calving grounds, and migration route for the Southern Qikiqtaaluk herd of Barren-ground caribou.

See also
List of lakes of Nunavut
List of lakes of Canada

References

Lakes of Qikiqtaaluk Region